Carmen Cavallaro (May 6, 1913 – October 12, 1989) was an American pianist. He established himself as one of the most accomplished and admired light music pianists of his generation.

Music career
Carmen Cavallaro was born in New York City, United States. Known as the “Poet of the Piano”, he showed a gift for music from age three, picking out tunes on a toy piano. His parents were encouraged to develop the child's musical talents and he studied classical piano in the United States. As a young pianist, he toured Europe, performing in many capitals.

In 1933, Cavallaro joined Al Kavelin's orchestra, where he quickly became the featured soloist. After four years, he switched to a series of other big bands, including Rudy Vallee's in 1937. He also worked briefly with Enric Madriguera and Abe Lyman.

Cavallaro formed his own band, a five-piece combo, in St. Louis, Missouri, in 1939. His popularity grew and his group expanded into a 14-piece orchestra, releasing some 19 albums for Decca over the years. Although his band traveled the country and played in all the top spots, he made a particular impact at the Mark Hopkins Hotel in San Francisco, which became a favored venue, and which also later became a favorite spot of George Shearing and Mel Tormé. Other venues where he drew large audiences included New York’s Hotel Astor, Chicago’s Palmer House and the Coconut Grove in Los Angeles. In 1963 he had a million-seller hit recording of the song, "Sukiyaki".

One of Cavallaro's vocalists, Guy Mitchell, later became famous in his own right.

Cavallaro's single best-selling recording was his pop version of "Chopin's 'Polonaise'", Op. 53.

He was awarded a Star on the Hollywood Walk of Fame at 6301 Hollywood Boulevard in Hollywood.

Influences and style
Cavallaro developed a piano-playing style of glittering and rippling arpeggios to augment his melody, which was often arranged in thick and lush triple- and quadruple-octave chords. His musical interests and arrangements included dance music, particularly Latin rhythms, tangos and strict tempo dancing styles, as well as some pop and jazz arrangements of classical melodies. In this, he is often cited as being influenced by pianist Eddy Duchin. Liberace was greatly influenced by both Cavallaro and Duchin. All three shared a propensity for arranging classical piano themes in a pop idiom.

Cavallaro became a member of ASCAP in 1957. Although he wrote several songs, including "Dolores My Own" and "Anita", the most popular were "While the Nightwind Sings" and "Masquerade Waltz".

Radio and film
Cavallaro also became famous through the media of radio and film, firstly with his regular program on NBC during the 1940s, The Sheaffer Parade, of which he was the host, and later in films where he played himself, starting with Hollywood Canteen (1944), then Diamond Horseshoe, Out of This World (both 1945) and The Time, The Place and The Girl (1946). His most celebrated film achievement was playing the piano music for actor Tyrone Power’s hands to mime, in The Eddy Duchin Story (1956).

Personal life
Cavallaro was married to Wanda Cavallaro on 6 May 1935. They had three children (Delores Cavallaro Buscher, Paul Cavallaro and Anita Cavallaro Finkelstein) and one grandchild (Andrea Finkelstein Sherman). They were divorced on 28 December 1962.

Cavallaro died from prostate cancer on 12 October 1989 in Columbus, Ohio. He was survived by his second wife Donna S. Cavallaro and children.

CAVALLARO Donna S. Cavallaro, age 79, Friday, December 16, 2011 at Mt. Carmel West. Preceded in death by husband Carmen and brother Fr. Robert Schwenker, OMI. Survived by stepsons, Charles (Michelle), Frederick (Kristin) and Robert (Theresa);

Discography

Albums
 1941: I'll See You In My Dreams, Decca Records
 1941: All The Things You Are ..., Decca Records
 1942: Strauss Waltzes, Decca Records
 1942: Songs Of Our Times 1932, Decca Records
 1947: Serenade: Italian Folk Songs, Decca Records
 1948: Irving Berlin Songs with Dick Haymes, Decca Records
 1949: For Sweethearts Only, Decca Records
 1950: Carmen Cavallaro At The Piano, Decca Records
 1950: Songs Of Our Times 1921, Decca Records
 1950: Richard Rodgers And Oscar Hammerstein II, Decca Records
 1951: Guys And Dolls, Decca Records
 1952: Tangos for Romance, Decca Records
 1956: Rome at Midnight, Decca Records
 1956: For Latin Lovers, Decca Records
 1956: The Masters' Touch, Decca Records
 1957: Poetry In Ivory, Decca Records
 1958: Cavallaro With That Latin Beat, Brunswick Records
 1958: 12 Easy Lessons In Love, Decca Records
 1959: Dancing In The Dark, Decca Records
 1960: Informally Yours, Decca Records
 1960: Plays His Show Stoppers, Decca Records
 1960: The Franz Liszt Story. Decca Records
 1960: Cocktails with Cavallaro, Decca Records
 1961: Cocktail Time, Decca Records
 1962: Swingin' Easy, Decca Records
 1962: Hits from Hollywood, Decca Records
 1965: Eddy Duchin Remembered, Decca Records

References

External links

 
 Carmen Cavallaro recordings at the Discography of American Historical Recordings.
 Carmen Cavallaro playing "La Vie en Rose" on a 7 ft Grand Piano

1913 births
1989 deaths
Easy listening musicians
Big band bandleaders
Light music composers
20th-century American pianists
American male pianists
20th-century American male musicians
Decca Records artists